Corinne may refer to:

 Corinne (name)
 Corinne (horse)
 Corinne, Michigan
 Corinne, Oklahoma
 Corinne, Utah
 Corinne, Saskatchewan
 Corinne, West Virginia

See also
 Corrine, Corrina, a traditional country blues song
 Corrine (disambiguation)
 Corine (disambiguation)
 Corina (disambiguation)
 Corinna (disambiguation)
 Corrina
 Coreen